Bob Fox is an English folk guitarist and singer, specialising in traditional and contemporary songs of the north-east of England and in particular, the coal mining communities thereof. He is noted for his collaborations with Tom McConville and Stu Luckley, and for solo performances since 1982.

Biography
Fox was born in 1953 in Seaham, County Durham, England. After discovering he could sing while in school he taught himself guitar and started singing in folk clubs while at the same time training to be a teacher in Durham, where he qualified in 1975. He commenced his singing career as a resident at the "Davy Lamp" Folk Club in Washington, Tyne and Wear in approx. 1970 and in 1975, teamed up to form a professional duo with fellow north-eastern singer (and fiddle player) Tom McConville for 2 years (1975–77). After this he formed a duo with ex-Hedgehog Pie singer, guitarist and acoustic bass guitar player Stu Luckley which performed all over the United Kingdom and recorded two albums, the first of which Nowt So Good'll Pass was voted Folk Album of the Year by Melody Maker in 1978. Fox and Luckley became a popular attraction on the UK folk scene and supported Richard and Linda Thompson and Ralph McTell on major British tours. After ceasing the partnership with Luckley in 1982 to pursue individual projects, Fox has maintained a successful career as a solo folk performer for over 30 years. During the 1990s, together with Benny Graham he developed a multi-media show documenting the coal mining communities of Durham and Northumberland, which led to the CD "How Are You Off For Coals", featuring a selection of mining songs. In 2006 Fox, along with a range of other top UK folk artists, was involved in providing performances for the "2006 Radio Ballads" commissioned by BBC Radio, and in 2009 he performed in the part of "Songman" in the highly acclaimed West End production of War Horse which played in the West End for 18 months and was subsequently toured for another eighteen months around Britain, Ireland and South Africa. Scholar Anthony Ashbolt describes Fox as "possessing one of the best folk-singing voices in England and he evokes the world of the miners and, in general, the songs of the northeast, with power and clarity."

Discography

Bob Fox and Stu Luckley
 Nowt So Good'll Pass Rubber RUB 028 1978 album details
 Wish We Never Had Parted Black Crow CRO 204 1982 album details
 Box Of Gold Fellside FECD124 1997 album details
 Thirty Years On Bob Fox Music BFMCD010 2008 album details

Bob Fox and Benny Graham
 How Are You Off For Coals? Fellside FECD111 1996 album details

Solo
 Dreams Never Leave You Woodworm WRCD035 2000 album details
 Borrowed Moments Topic TSCD544 2003 album details
 The Blast Topic TSCD555 2006 album details
 The Song Man Bob Fox Music BFMCD011 201?

The Hush (Jed Grimes, Garry Linsley, Graham Wood, Paul Smith and Neil Harland) with Bob Fox
 Dark to the Sky MWMCD SP54 2002 album details

Various Artists: The 2006 Radio Ballads
Bob Fox features on albums including The Song of Steel, The Enemy That Lives Within, The Horn of the Hunter, Swings and Roundabouts, Thirty Years of Conflict and The Ballad of the Big Ships, also on the compilation album The Songs of the Radio Ballads.

Billy Mitchell and Bob Fox
 Five Star B&B B&B B&BCD01 2007 album details
 Back on City Road B&B B&BCD02 2009 album details

The Pitmen Poets (Benny Graham, Billy Mitchell, Bob Fox, Jez Lowe)
 The Pitmen Poets (label?) PPCD1 2015 album details

References

Living people
English folk singers
English folk guitarists
English male guitarists
1953 births
People from Seaham